Ruslan Kachur (born 9 June 1982 in Vatutine, Cherkasy Oblast, Ukrainian SSR) is a Ukrainian footballer currently playing as a forward for FC Cherkaskyi Dnipro.

He is a product of the Vatutine and Cherkasy sports schools system, and later played for clubs from Central Ukraine.

Honours
 Ukrainian League Cup
 Winner (1): 2009–10

References

External links
 
 
 Profile at the Professional Football League of Ukraine
 

1982 births
Living people
People from Cherkasy Oblast
Ukrainian footballers
Ukrainian expatriate footballers
Association football forwards
FC Dnipro Cherkasy players
FC Dnister Ovidiopol players
Expatriate footballers in Azerbaijan
Simurq PIK players
FC Nyva Vinnytsia players
FC Helios Kharkiv players
Expatriate footballers in Uzbekistan
Navbahor Namangan players
FC Cherkashchyna players
FC LNZ Cherkasy players
Azerbaijan Premier League players
Uzbekistan Super League players
Sportspeople from Cherkasy Oblast